Cryptocoryne mekongensis is a species belonging to the Araceae genus Cryptocoryne that was described in 2010.

Distribution
The species is found in the Mekong region of southern Laos and Cambodia.

Description
The species is characterized by a one to three times twisted spathe limb that is purple colored at the inside, with a purple collar. The limb also has pronounced transverse surface ridges.

Cultivation
The species is easy to cultivate emersed with much light in a sandy soil with some loam added.

References

mekongensis
Aquatic plants
Plants described in 2010
Flora of Laos
Flora of Cambodia